The 2021 Italian Athletics Championships was the 111st edition of the Italian Athletics Championships which took place in Rovereto from 25 to 27 June. It is the second edition held in this town, after 2014 edition.

However national racewalking titles were also awarded earlier. 10,000 m championships were held in Molfetta on 2 May.

National records

110 metres hurdles: Paolo Dal Molin 13:27

Champions

Road events

Track & field events

In the Quercia Stadium of Rovereto (26 and 27 June).

Note: athletes with a Q are qualified or already qualified for 2020 Olympics with Standard entry.
Key:

Top ten results in the Italian all-time lists

In this edition of the championships 12 athletes, 6 men and 6 women, have set a top ten all-time performance in the Italian lists.

Men

Women

See also
2021 Italian Athletics Indoor Championships

References

External links
 

Italian Athletics Championships
Athletics
Italian Athletics Outdoor Championships
Athletics competitions in Italy
Italian Athletics Championships
Rovereto